is a railway station on the Isumi Line operated by the Isumi Railway Company, located in Isumi, Chiba Prefecture, Japan.

History
Higashi-Fusamoto Station was opened on February 1, 1937 as a station on the Japanese Government Railway (JGR) Kihara Line.  Initially, only gasoline-powered locomotives serviced the station. The station was closed on  June 10, 1945. It reopened on June 10, 1946 as a station on the Japanese National Railways (JNR). With the division and privatization of the Japan National Railways on April 1, 1987, the station was acquired by the East Japan Railway Company. On March 24, 1988, the Kihara Line became the Isumi Railroad Isumi Line. In 2008, the station building was completely rebuilt as a project by TV Tokyo for the popular TV documentary show "Champions".

Lines
Higashi-Fusamoto Station is served by the Isumi Line and is 19.6 kilometers from the eastern terminus of the Izumi Line at Ōhara Station.

Station layout
The station has a simple side platform serving bidirectional traffic, with a three-sided rain shelter built onto the platform. The station is unstaffed.

Platforms

Adjacent stations

Surrounding area
National Highway Route 465

See also
 List of railway stations in Japan

External links

   Isumi Railway Company home page

Railway stations in Japan opened in 1937
Railway stations in Chiba Prefecture